Giampaolo Calanchini (4 February 1937 – 19 March 2007) was an Italian fencer. He won a bronze medal in the team sabre at the 1960 Summer Olympics and a silver in the same event at the 1964 Summer Olympics.

References

1937 births
2007 deaths
Italian male fencers
Olympic fencers of Italy
Fencers at the 1960 Summer Olympics
Fencers at the 1964 Summer Olympics
Olympic silver medalists for Italy
Olympic bronze medalists for Italy
Olympic medalists in fencing
Medalists at the 1960 Summer Olympics
Medalists at the 1964 Summer Olympics